Among the thirty known species of Durio, so far eleven species have been identified to produce edible fruits. However, there are many species for which the fruit has never been collected or properly described and it is likely that other species with edible fruit exist. The currently known nine species of edible durians are:

The other species, which haven't been identified to produce edible fruits are:

See also
 List of durian diseases and pests

References

Durio
Durio List
Durio List
Durio List
Durio List